Steganotaenia is a genus of flowering plant in the family Apiaceae.

, Plants of the World Online accepted the following species:
 Steganotaenia araliacea Hochst.
 Steganotaenia commiphoroides Thulin
 Steganotaenia hockii (C.Norman) C.Norman

References

Taxonomy articles created by Polbot
Apioideae
Apioideae genera